Jim O'Brien may refer to:

Sports

Basketball
Jim O'Brien (basketball, born 1950), American coach for Emerson College, Ohio State and Boston College
Jim O'Brien (basketball, born 1951), American player for the New York Nets and Memphis Sounds
Jim O'Brien (basketball, born 1952), American coach for the Boston Celtics, Philadelphia 76ers, and Indiana Pacers

Football and rugby
Jim O'Brien (American football) (born 1947), professional football player
Jim O'Brien (Australian footballer) (1936–1996), Australian rules footballer for St Kilda
Jimmy O'Brien (footballer) (1885–1954), Australian rules footballer for Essendon
Jim O'Brien (footballer, born 1987), Scottish footballer
Jim O'Brien (rugby) (1897–1969), New Zealand dual-code rugby international
Jim O'Brien (rugby league) (1896–1988), New Zealand rugby league player
Jamie O'Brien (footballer) (born 1990), Irish association footballer

Hurling
Jim O'Brien (Limerick hurler) (born 1945), Irish hurler for Limerick
Jim O'Brien (Tipperary hurler), Irish hurler
Jimmy O'Brien (born 1937), Irish hurler for Wexford

Other sports

Jim O'Brien (ice hockey) (born 1989), American ice hockey center

Other
Jim O'Brien (director) (1947–2012), Scottish-born stage and television director
Jim O'Brien (reporter) (1939–1983), reporter and television personality
Jim O'Brien, founder and CEO of oil spill cleanup company The O'Brien's Group

See also
James O'Brien (disambiguation)
Jimmy O'Brien (disambiguation)